is a railway station in the city of Sakura, Tochigi, Japan, operated by the East Japan Railway Company (JR East).

Lines

Station layout
This station has two island platforms connected to the station building by a footbridge; however, only one side of each platform is in use. The station is unattended.

Platforms

History
Kamasusaka Station opened on 11 February 1923. With the privatization of JNR on 1 April 1987, the station came under the control of JR East.

See also
 List of railway stations in Japan

References

External links

 JR East station information 

Railway stations in Tochigi Prefecture
Tōhoku Main Line
Utsunomiya Line
Railway stations in Japan opened in 1923
Sakura, Tochigi
Stations of East Japan Railway Company